Geranium wallichianum is a species of hardy flowering herbaceous perennial plant in the genus Geranium, family Geraniaceae. It is native to the Himalayas. It is suitable for cultivation in temperate climates, in the front of the border.

The specific epithet wallichianum honours the Danish plant hunter Dr Nathaniel Wallich (1786-1854).

Various cultivars have been selected, including ='Gerwat', which has gained the Royal Horticultural Society's Award of Garden Merit. It is larger and more floriferous than the species.

References

wallichianum